Crystal Lake Airport  is a privately owned, public use airport located two nautical miles (4 km) northeast of the central business district of Decatur, a city in Benton County, Arkansas, United States.

Facilities and aircraft 
Crystal Lake Airport covers an area of 10 acres (4 ha) at an elevation of 1,177 feet (359 m) above mean sea level. It has one runway designated 13/31 with an asphalt surface measuring 3,863 by 75 feet (1,177 x 23 m).

For the 12-month period ending March 31, 2010, the airport had 750 general aviation aircraft operations, an average of 62 per month. At that time there were 8 aircraft based at this airport, all single-engine.

References

External links 
  at the Arkansas Department of Aeronautics
 Aerial image as of April 2000 from USGS The National Map
 
 
 

Airports in Arkansas
Transportation in Benton County, Arkansas
Buildings and structures in Benton County, Arkansas